The Assemblies of God is a pentecostal Christian denomination in Romania.

History
The church has its origins in the 1920s with Assemblies of God USA missionaries from the United States coming to Romania to spread the Gospel. The Romanian organization was first known as Christians Baptised with the Holy Spirit and was recognized as a religious association. In 1950 the communist government dissolved all particular pentecostal organizations and forced them to merge into a single body known as the Apostolic Church of God. In 1980 the Apostolic Church cut all ties with the World Assemblies of God Fellowship. Following the Romanian Revolution, in 1996, the church separated itself from the Apostolic Church and became a distinct organization affiliated with the World Assemblies of God Fellowship.

The church has applied for an official recognition from the state, which is expected to be granted over the course of 2022.

Notes

Evangelicalism in Romania
Religious organizations established in the 1990s
Pentecostal denominations established in the 20th century
Pentecostal denominations in Europe
Religious organizations based in Bucharest